Edward McClain may refer to:
 Edward McClain (Alabama politician)
 Edward F. McClain, member of the Wisconsin State Assembly
 Edward B. McClain Jr., Liberian politician
 Boots McClain, American Negro league infielder